John Christian Wray (born November 20, 1970) is an American lawyer, businessman, and politician. He served as a member of the Texas House of Representatives for the 10th district from 2015 to 2021. Wray is a member of Republican Party. He lost the special election race for district 10 on September 28, 2021.

Early life and education
Wray graduated from Waxahachie High School in 1989. He earned a Bachelor of Science degree in political science from Texas A&M University and a Juris Doctor from the University of Texas School of Law.

Career 
He is a former mayor of Waxahachie and past member of the Waxahachie City Council. He practiced law for six years in Houston, Texas, prior to returning to Waxahachie. He is the co-owner of Town Square Title, a title company.

John, was first elected in 2014 to represent Texas House District 10. In July 2019, Wray publicized that he would not run for re-election for district 10, of the Texas State House of Representatives. In a news release he stated that, "these elected jobs are not meant to be lifetime positions". Two years later on July 29, 2021, Wray announced his candidacy for district 10 in a special election to replace Jake Ellzey, who vacated the district seat after winning he 2021 Texas's 6th congressional district special election two days prior.

Elections
Wray won a runoff election on May 27, 2014, against T. J. Fabby with 6,031 votes (52.9 percent) to 5,363 (47.1 percent), for the right to succeed the retiring Republican Representative Jim Pitts, who had held the seat since 1993.

In the general election held on November 6, 2018, Wray retained his House seat for a third term. With 44,601 votes (70.3 percent), he defeated Democrat Kimberly Emery, who polled 17,405 votes (27.4 percent). A Libertarian, Matt Savino, polled another 1,453 ballots (2.3 percent).

In 2021, Wray announced his candidacy for the Texas House of Representatives District 10 special election to replace Jake Ellzey, who vacated the district seat after winning Texas's 6th congressional district special election. Wray was endorsed by Texans for Lawsuit Reform. The special election was held on August 31, 2021, and Wray placed second with 36 percent of the vote with 4,031 votes and Brian Harrison placed first with 41 percent of the vote with 4,613 votes. He and Harrison faced each other in a runoff election which he lost against Harrison 55.38% to 44.62%.

Personal life
Wray and his wife, Michele, have two children.

References

External links
 Campaign website
 State legislative page
 John Wray at the Texas Tribune

1971 births
Living people
Politicians from Dallas
People from Waxahachie, Texas
Politicians from Houston
Republican Party members of the Texas House of Representatives
Texas city council members
Mayors of places in Texas
Texas lawyers
Waxahachie High School alumni
Texas A&M University alumni
University of Texas School of Law alumni
21st-century American politicians
American United Methodists
People from Hillsboro, Texas
Candidates in the 2021 United States elections